The Nigeria Gazette was the government gazette for the Colony and Protectorate of Nigeria. It was published at Lagos between 1914 and 1954.

It replaced the Northern Nigeria Gazette and the Southern Nigeria Government Gazette and was continued by the Federation of Nigeria Official Gazette.

See also
List of British colonial gazettes

References

External links
Nigeria official publications at the British Library

Publications established in 1914
Publications disestablished in 1954
Colonial Nigeria
History of Nigeria
Government gazettes of Nigeria